Sacramento Knights were an indoor soccer team that played from 1993 to 2001 in ARCO Arena and were owned by the NBA's Sacramento Kings.  The team played in the Continental Indoor Soccer League from 1993 to 1997. The team then moved to the World Indoor Soccer League in 1998 after the CISL folded. The team itself folded when the WISL merged with the Major Indoor Soccer League in 2001.

Personnel
The Knights were coached by retired English player Keith Weller from 1994 to 1997.  Iain Fraser took over as head coach in 1998 as the team reformed in the Premier Soccer Alliance.

CISL award winners include 1995 Goalkeeper of the Year Mike Dowler, and two Defenders of the Year: Sean Bowers (1994) and Danny Pena (1995).

Iain Fraser won the Defender of the Year award in 1999 and 2001, while the Knights were part of the World Indoor Soccer League.  Fraser took over as coach/player/director of the team until its end.  Also as part of the WISL, Dan Madsen was goalkeeper of the year in 1998.

Year-by-year

Notable players
 Iain Fraser
 Randy Soderman
 Rick Soderman

See also
Sacramento Knights players

References

Defunct indoor soccer clubs in the United States
Association football clubs disestablished in 2001
Association football clubs established in 1993
Continental Indoor Soccer League teams
Premier Soccer Alliance teams
K
World Indoor Soccer League teams
1993 establishments in California
2001 disestablishments in California
Soccer clubs in California